Semyon Olegovich Matviychuk (born 1 May 1998) is a Russian football player. He plays for FC Znamya Noginsk.

Club career
He made his debut in the Russian Professional Football League for FC Dynamo-2 Moscow on 3 October 2016 in a game against FC Strogino Moscow.

He made his debut for the main PFC CSKA Moscow squad on 10 October 2018 in a Russian Cup game against FC Tyumen.

He made his Russian Football National League debut for FC SKA-Khabarovsk on 7 July 2019 in a game against FC Shinnik Yaroslavl.

International
He was a member of the Russia national under-17 football team at the 2015 FIFA U-17 World Cup and started in all four games the team played at the tournament.

References

External links
 

1998 births
Sportspeople from Tolyatti
Living people
Russian footballers
Russia youth international footballers
Association football defenders
FC Dynamo Moscow reserves players
PFC CSKA Moscow players
FC SKA-Khabarovsk players
FC Tekstilshchik Ivanovo players
Russian First League players
Russian Second League players